Puducherry is a Union Territory of India, with four exclaved districts; Puducherry district and Karaikal district (surrounded by the state of Tamil Nadu), Mahé district (surrounded by the state of Kerala) and Yanam district (surrounded by the state of Andhra Pradesh), with Pondicherry district having the largest area and population and Mahe district having the smallest area and population. All four districts retained the borders of French India, and were incorporated into the Republic of India after the de facto transfer of the territories of French India in 1954.

Districts

See also
 Puducherry
 French India
 Union Territory
 List of communes in Puducherry

References

External links 

 
Districts
Puducherry